Gin Gin–Mount Perry–Monto Road is a continuous  road route in the Bundaberg and North Burnett regions of Queensland, Australia. It has two official names, Gin Gin–Mount Perry Road and Monto–Mount Perry Road. The entire route is signed as State Route 12.

Gin Gin–Mount Perry Road (number 474) is a state-controlled district road rated as a local road of regional significance (LRRS) and Monto–Mount Perry Road (number 476) is  also a state-controlled district road rated as LRRS.

Route description
The road commences at an intersection with the Bruce Highway (A1) in Gin Gin. It turns south-east where it enters Mount Perry as Heusman Street before turning south-west and exiting as Annie Street. Heusman Street continues south-east and then turns south as Gayndah-Mount Perry Road.

History

Pastoral leases were taken up in the Fraser Coast Region from 1843 and European settlement of what is now Gin Gin began in 1848. In 1887,  of land were resumed from the Gin Gin pastoral run for the establishment of small farms. Further west,  were resumed from Moolboolaman. The land was offered for selection on 17 April 1887. The opening of new farms led to the development of roads to the west of Gin Gin.

Pastoral leases were taken up in the Mount Perry district from 1849, and copper was discovered in 1869. The road was completed quickly, but a railway was not approved until 1877 and only arrived in 1884. Meanwhile, further road improvements had been undertaken.

Europeans settled in the Monto area from the 1840s, maintaining large pastoral holdings. Gold was discovered in the 1870s, and in 1881 the first school opened. When gold reserves dwindled the activities of logging and farming became predominant. One such farming area was to the south-east, encompassing  and other localities. A road was built to Langley and eventually extended to Mount Perry.

Upgrade

Progressive sealing
A project to progressively seal three sections of the road, at a cost of $26.6 million, was under construction in April 2022.

Major intersections
All distances are from Google Maps.

See also

 List of road routes in Queensland
 List of numbered roads in Queensland
 Boolboonda Tunnel

Notes

References

Roads in Queensland